The Godfrey-Kellogg House is a historic house at 212 Kenduskeag Road in Bangor, Maine, USA. Built in about 1847, it is one of the state's finest and least-altered examples of residential Gothic Revival architecture. It was listed on the National Register of Historic Places in 1973.

Description and history
The Godfrey-Kellog House stands north of downtown Bangor, on the west side of Kenduskeag Road, overlooking Kenduskeag Stream. The house is a rambling -story wood-frame structure, with a variety of projecting bays, gable dormers, and other architectural details. Its gables are adorned with jigsawn vergeboard, with the main gables topped by decorative finials. Walls are finished mainly in vertical board-and-batten siding, with some elements clapboarded and others finished in flushboard. Its porches are topped by low jigsawn balustrades. The barn and carriage house both have living quarters on the upper level.

The house was built about 1847 for John Godfrey, as a summer residence for his family; its architect is unknown. At the time of its construction, it would have had a view of the Bangor downtown, and of the nearby Morse Mill and covered bridge (neither of which is now standing). The property is notable for its architecture, and its state of preservation, having had relatively little alteration to either the interiors or exteriors of any of the buildings.

See also
National Register of Historic Places listings in Penobscot County, Maine

References

Houses on the National Register of Historic Places in Maine
Gothic Revival architecture in Maine
Houses completed in 1847
Houses in Bangor, Maine
1847 establishments in Maine
National Register of Historic Places in Bangor, Maine